Bifrenaria stefanae is a species of orchid.

stefanae